"The Great American Hoax" is a 1957 episode of the TV series The 20th Century Fox Hour.

This was the last TV play written by Paddy Chayefsky, and was based on a story of his, filmed as As Young as You Feel (1951). It originally was titled The Age of Retirement.

Ed Wynn was signed to play the lead in a rare non-comedy role. Filming took place in March 1957.

References

External links

1957 American television episodes
Works by Paddy Chayefsky
Television anthology episodes